The 2006 Republican Party scandals resulted in four resignations and three election losses for Republican politicians during the first two years of George W. Bush's second term as President and leading up to the 2006 midterm elections.

The Democratic Party unified several local and national campaigns around the slogan or meme "culture of corruption". The phrase was used to describe any political scandal, beginning with a national attempt by Gov. Howard Dean (D-VT) to link allegations of insider trading by Senator Bill Frist (R-TN) to the then-emerging Abramoff Scandal. Dean asserted that "Republicans have made their culture of corruption the norm." The phrase was thereafter repeated by other Democratic Party leaders, including Nancy Pelosi (responding to the indictment of Tom DeLay), "The criminal indictment of Majority Leader Tom DeLay is the latest example that Republicans in Congress are plagued by a culture of corruption at the expense of the American people."

List of politicians

Resigned

Lost re-election

2006 elections

Democratic party victory
Political corruption was a key issue cited by voters at exit polls during the 2006 Midterm Elections.  The Democratic Party regained control of the House of Representatives and the Senate. Democrats also regained a majority of state governorships and control over a plurality of state legislatures.

Individual districts
Arizona's 8th congressional district: Following the emergence of Foley's controversy and the retirement of Jim Kolbe, Democrat Gabby Giffords won the election with 54% of the vote despite the fact that George W. Bush carried the district with 53% just two years prior in the 2004 presidential election.
California's 50th congressional district: Following the emergence of the Cunningham scandal and the resignation of Duke Cunningham, Republican Brian Bilbray barely won the special election with 50% of the vote despite the fact that George W. Bush carried the district with 55% just two years prior in the 2004 presidential election.
Florida's 16th congressional district: Following the emergence of the Mark Foley scandal and the resignation of Mark Foley, Democrat Tim Mahoney won the special election with 50% of the vote despite the fact that George W. Bush carried the district with 54% just two years prior in the 2004 presidential election. Mahoney lost re-election in 2008.
New York's 19th congressional district: Following the emergence of the Foley scandal, Republican Sue W. Kelly was defeated by Democrat John Hall with 51% of the vote despite the fact that George W. Bush carried the district with 54% just two years prior in the 2004 presidential election.
Pennsylvania's 7th congressional district: Following the emergence of numerous controversies, Republican Curt Weldon was defeated by Democrat Joe Sestak with 56% of the vote.
Pennsylvania's 10th congressional district: Following the emergence of an extramarital affair, Republican Don Sherwood was defeated by Democrat Chris Carney with 53% of the vote despite the fact that George W. Bush carried the district with 60% just two years prior in the 2004 presidential election..
Texas's 22nd congressional district: Following the emergence of the Tom DeLay campaign finance investigation and the resignation of Tom DeLay, Democrat Nick Lampson won the special election with 51% of the vote despite the fact that George W. Bush carried the district with 64% just two years prior in the 2004 presidential election. Lampson lost re-election in 2008.

Republican response

Background
Responding to the use of the phrase "culture of corruption" by the Democratic Party, authors Lynn Vincent and Robert Stacy McCain published "Donkey Cons" in April, 2006. A review on right-wing web site WorldNet Daily said: "Vincent and McCain do not claim that the Republican Party boasts only the good, the pure and the beautiful, as Aristotle said..."  Democrat William Jefferson was re-elected in his district despite the ongoing investigation, which some political commentators such as Rush Limbaugh have decried as a hypocrisy of the "culture of corruption" label with which the DNC had been branding the Republicans.

Republicans have also accused House Speaker Nancy Pelosi of hypocrisy, who had promised to "drain the swamp" and have "the most open, most honest, most ethical Congress in history,"  while defending the unethical former House Ways and Means Chair Charlie Rangel.

2006 Democratic party scandals
While usually avoiding using the phrase, Republicans responded to Democratic charges by pointing out that Democrats had also been involved in similar scandals. These Democrats included:

Congressman William J. Jefferson, whose Congressional offices were raided by the FBI in May 2006
Alabama Governor Don Siegelman, convicted on corruption charges in June 2006

List of scandals
Jack Abramoff Indian lobbying scandal
Mark Foley scandal
Tom DeLay campaign finance investigation
Plame affair
Cunningham scandal
Jerry Lewis – Lowery lobbying firm controversy
Bush administration payment of columnists

See also
Criminalization of politics
Culture of Life
Culture of Death

References

External links
TheCultureofCorruption.com (Independent Party)
Culture of Corruption: A Week of GOP Scandals (from the webpage of the Democratic Party)
A look at the scandals from the left
"In California, sigh of relief for GOP" by Linda Feldmann, Christian Science Monitor, June 8, 2006, retrieved June 21, 2006
"The Democrats' Culture of Corruption" Accuracy in Media, Cliff Kincaid, April 28, 2006
DeLay indicted, steps down as majority leader
Dean decries GOP's "culture of corruption"
SEC issues subpoena to Frist, sources say
Dean slam at GOP puts Democrats in tricky spot
Republican Culture of Corruption Reaches Alaska (from the webpage of the Democratic Party)
"Scandals Alone Could Cost Republicans Their House Majority", by Jonathan Weisman and Jeffrey H. Birnbaum, Washington Post, November 2, 2006, page A01

2006 in American politics
2006 scandals
American political catchphrases
Political scandals in the United States
2006 controversies in the United States
Political corruption in the United States
Political corruption scandals in the United States
Congressional scandals
Republican Party (United States)